Bryce Davison (born January 29, 1986, in Walnut Creek, California) is an American-Canadian former competitive pair skater. With former partner Jessica Dubé, he is a three-time (2007, 2009, 2010) Canadian national champion, the 2008 World bronze medalist and the 2009 Four Continents silver medalist.

They represented Canada at the 2006 and 2010 Winter Olympics.

Career 
Davison began skating at age three. He competed with Jessie McNeil at the pre-novice and juvenile levels. They were the 2000 Canadian Juvenile national champions. He later competed with Claire Daugulis on the novice and junior levels.

Davison teamed up with Jessica Dubé in July 2003. The two had a successful junior career before moving up to the senior level in 2005–06. They placed 10th at the 2006 Winter Olympic Games and 7th at the World Championships that same season.

In the summer of 2006, Dubé suffered an injury in practice and was removed from the ice on a backboard; she had knee surgery in September. They won their first national crown in Nova Scotia at the 2007 Canadian Championships. After an on-ice accident at the 2007 Four Continents (see below), they made a comeback a month later at the World Championships, where they again finished seventh.

Dube and Davison had a breakthrough season in 2007–08. They won their first Grand Prix medals, including a gold at 2007 Skate America. They lost the national title to Anabelle Langlois and Cody Hay at the 2008 Canadian Championships, but two months later at the World Championships, they won the bronze medal after finishing second in the long program; they set personal best scores in each segment of the event and overall.

The next two seasons did not prove as successful, and while they regained and then defended their national title, the pair were unable to repeat their success at the World Championships. Their top placement during this time was a second-place finish at the 2009 Four Continents Championships. Dube and Davison were part of Team Canada at the inaugural World Team Trophy in April 2009. In the 2009–10 Olympic season, they medalled at both Grand Prix events but did not qualify for the Grand Prix final. They were sixth at the Olympics and at Worlds.

Davison suffers from osteochondritis dissecans, which led to his sustaining a serious knee injury in practice in October 2010, forcing the pair to withdraw from the 2010 Skate Canada International. He underwent season-ending surgery to reattach a broken piece of bone. The recovery period was estimated at 18 months.

Dubé and Davison announced the end of their partnership on March 10, 2011. He had felt they needed to make changes but Dubé was unwilling and suggested parting ways. Davison left open the possibility that he might continue skating if he finds the right partner. In July, it was reported that Davison had completed his Level I Coaching Certification and would begin coaching young skaters in Hamilton, Ontario. At the time, Davison said he might compete again, but in December 2011, he confirmed that he had retired from competition. He is the director of skater development at the Hamilton Skating Club.

Davison competed in singles until 2007. He is a member of the Hamilton Skating Club in Hamilton, Ontario.

Accidents 
On February 8, 2007, Dubé was struck in the face by the blade of Davison's skate during the free skate segment at the Four Continents Championships in Colorado Springs. The pair were on their third rotation of a side-by-side camel spin, in which one leg is horizontal during the spin, when Davison‘s spin began to travel towards Dubé, causing his skate blade to contact her face. She immediately fell to the ice and clutched at her face as blood pooled on the ice. Davison comforted her as the medical staff put her on a stretcher and took her to Memorial Hospital. She underwent surgery that night, receiving 83 stitches to repair a laceration on her left cheek and nose. Her eye was not affected and nothing was broken. Both skaters were later treated for post-traumatic stress disorder, but by March 2007 they had returned to competition together.
	
In April 2009, at the gala exhibition of the 2009 World Team Trophy in Tokyo, Dubé accidentally struck Davison on the head during a triple twist; he was unable to catch her and she crashed to the ice, hitting her head. Dubé and Davison were hospitalized as a precautionary measure, but neither was seriously injured.

Personal life 
Davison has dual American and Canadian citizenship. In addition to figure skating, he also played hockey until age 15. He formerly dated his partner Dubé. Davison studied human anatomy and physiology through Athabasca University online courses. He married retired Canadian synchronized skater Michele Moore Davison on September 9, 2017. The couple have two children together.

Programs 
(With Dubé)

Competitive highlights

Pairs career with Dubé

Pairs career with Daugulis

Singles career

References

External links

 
Partnership biography from Skate Canada

1986 births
American emigrants to Canada
Canadian male single skaters
Canadian male pair skaters
Figure skaters at the 2006 Winter Olympics
Figure skaters at the 2010 Winter Olympics
Living people
Olympic figure skaters of Canada
Sportspeople from Walnut Creek, California
People from Huntsville, Ontario
People from Varennes, Quebec
World Figure Skating Championships medalists
Four Continents Figure Skating Championships medalists
World Junior Figure Skating Championships medalists